Oodaigahara may refer to:
Mount Ōdaigahara, a mountain in Japan
11151 Oodaigahara, a minor planet named after the mountain
'Third of May / Ōdaighara,' a song by Fleet Foxes from their album Crack-Up